The 2009–10 Premier League of Bosnia and Herzegovina (or just Premijer Liga) was the tenth season since its establishment and the eighth as a unified country-wide league. It began on 1 August 2009 and will end in May 2010. Zrinjski Mostar were the defending champions.

Team changes to 2008–09
Relegated after last year's season were 16th-placed NK Posušje and 15th-placed HNK Orašje.

They were replaced by the champions of the two second-level leagues, Olimpik Sarajevo (Prva Liga BiH) and Rudar Prijedor (Prva Liga RS).

Overview

Teams and stadia

Managerial changes

League table

Results

Top goalscorers
Source: nfsbih.ba''

References

External links
 BiH soccer 
 Football Association of Bosnia and Herzegovina official site 
 uefa.com
 top scorers

Premier League of Bosnia and Herzegovina seasons
1
Bosnia